Gunung Sewu Geopark or Sewu Mountains is a series of mountains stretching along the southern coast of Gunung Kidul Regency and Wonogiri Regency of Central Java, to Pacitan Regency of East Java in the island of Java, Indonesia. This is a national Geopark, which is also a member of Global Geopark Network (GGN), recognized by UNESCO in 2015.

Characteristics
These mountains have a unique landscape of karst area, it is characterized by the phenomenon on the surface (eksokarst) and subsurface (endokarst). Surface phenomena include positive formations, such as karst hills totaling ± 40,000 conical hills . Negative formation of karst valleys and karst lake. The subsurface phenomenon includes karst caves consisting of no less than 119 caves that have stalactites and stalagmites , and all underground river flows. Because of the uniqueness of its ecosystem , the 1993 International Union of Speleology proposed that the Karst Area of the Sewu Mountains enter into one of the world's natural heritage. In the caves are also found fossils of ancient human bones from the old stone age about 1.8 million years ago along with stone tools for hunting. The row of Sewu mountains was formed due to the lifting of the seabed thousands of years ago. Limestone rocks are characteristic of these mountains. The limestone hills are reported to contain hundreds of caves.  These are classified locally as vertical caves (known as luweng in Javanese) and horizontal caves.  Jomblang cave (Luweng Jomblang) and Grubug Cave (Luwung Grubug) located in the Semanu subdistrict in Gunungkidul, as well as other caves in the area, are well-known to local caving (speleological) groups. Some of the caves are quite long; Cerme cave, for example, has an entrance in Bantul Regency and stretches for quite a distance eastward into Panggang subdistrict in Gunung Kidul Regency.

Attractions
The Geopark has many caves, some of which have underground rivers. where tubing activities can be carried on.

Nglanggeran primeval volcano in the Patuk area is only 600 meters high but there are excellent views from the peak to the north towards Mount Merapi and to the south across to the coast of Java. Scattered giant granite and andesite rock formations called "watu wayang" (puppet rocks) are found at the Mt Nglanggeran area as well as a nearby man-made lake. It takes around 3 hours to hike from the Pendopo Kali Song entrance point to the peak.

Siung Beach Bay is about 300 meters length, but swimming is prohibited because of dangerous rocks and severe waves. The cliff surrounding the beach, with over 200 tracks, is suitable for rock climbing.

200 meters east of Siung Beach there is a 10-meter Jogan Tide Fall in Tepus district which is 70 kilometers from Yogyakarta in 2 hours drive. Rainy season is the best time to see the Jogan Tide Fall, because in dry season the water level is low.

See also

Members of the Global Geoparks Network
List of National Geoparks

References

Geoparks in Indonesia
Global Geoparks Network members
Protected areas of Indonesia